Tenorio or Tenório is a surname of Spanish origin and may refer to:

People
 Tenorio (surname)
 Tenorio, pseudonym of French writer Antoine Blondin

Places
 Tenório, municipality in the state of Paraíba in Brazil
 Tenorio River, river in Costa Rica
 Tenorio Rock, rock in Antarctica
 Tenorio Volcano, volcano in Costa Rica

Other
 Don Juan Tenorio, an 1844 play written by José Zorrilla